Raymond Brendan Manning (October 11, 1934 – January 18, 2000) was an American carcinologist, specialising in alpha taxonomy and mantis shrimp.

His zoological author abbreviation is Manning or sometimes R.B. Manning. He has authored over 500 taxa. See also: :Category:Taxa named by Raymond B. Manning and this query.

Biography
Raymond Manning was born in Brooklyn, New York, in 1934, but moved almost immediately with his mother to Haiti. They lived in Bethesda, Maryland, for the duration of the Second World War, but then returned to Haiti, to live in a house in Port-au-Prince owned by Raymond's adoptive father. Raymond was sent to a boarding school in Tampa, Florida, and studied at the University of Florida, gaining his B.S. (1956), M.S. (1959) and Ph.D. (1963) degrees from the University of Miami. While at university, Manning met and married Lilly King, who would be the illustrator for his scientific papers throughout his life. On completing his doctorate, Manning was immediately appointed an associate curator at the Smithsonian Institution.

Scientific career
Manning was "an extremely productive carcinologist"; during his lifetime, he produced 282 scientific papers and monographs on extant and fossil stomatopods and decapods, and a further eight papers have been published posthumously. More than one half of these papers were on stomatopods, with nearly one third being descriptions of new species. A total of 306 species, 153 genera, 5 subfamilies, 19 families and 3 superfamilies were described in papers written or co-written by Manning.

Manning was also an avid field biologist, and his collections, mostly from Florida, Ascension Island, and the Mediterranean Basin, amounted to more than 50,000 specimens. The collection of stomatopods he amassed is the largest in the world, and covers 90% of the known species.

Manning was one of the founders of the Crustacean Society, and its first president, and helped to establish the Journal of Crustacean Biology.

Publications

Taxa
Raymond Manning is commemorated in a number of scientific names of genera and species:

Acanthosquilla manningi Makarov, 1978
Acoridon manningi Adkison, Heard & Hopkins, 1983
Alain raymondi Ahyong & Ng, 2008
Arcotheres rayi Ahyong & Ng, 2007
Calaxiopsis manningi Komai, 2000
Calaxius manningi Kensley, Lin, & Yu, 2000
Cambarus manningi Hobbs, 1981
Cyclodorippe manningi Tavares, 1993
Eumanningia Crosnier, 2000
Eumanningia pliarthron Crosnier, 2000
Eunephrops manningi (Holthuis, 1975)
Grynaminna Poore, 2000
Holothuria mannigi Pawson, 1978
Lepidophthalmus manningi Felder & Staton, 2000
Lithodes manningi Macpherson, 1988
Lysiosquilla manningi Boyko, 2000
Manningia raymondi Bruce, 1986
Manningia Serène, 1960
Manningiana Pretzmann, 1972
Manningis Al-Khayat & Jones, 1996
Microprosthema manningi Goy & Felder, 1988
Nannosquilla raymanningi Salgado-Barragán & Hendrickx, 1998
Nanogalathea raymondi Tirmizi, 1980
Naushonia manningi Akvarez, Villalobos, & Iliffe
Neonesidea manningi Maddocks, 1975
Oratosquillina manningi Ahyong, Chan & Liao, 2000
Oxyrhynchaxius manningi Lin, Kensley, & Chan, 2000
Paralomis manningi Williams, Smith, & Baco, 2000
Pontonia manningi Fransen, 2000
Raninella manningi Bishops & Williams, 2000
Raylilia Galil, 2001
Raymanninus Ng, 2000
Raymunida Macpherson & Machordam, 2000
Raysquilla manningi Ahyong, 2000
Raysquilla Ahyong, 2000
Raytheres Campos, 2002
Sergia manningorum Froglia & Gramitto, 2000
Thor manningi Chace, 1972
Trizocheles manningi Forest, 1986
Typton manningi Bruce, 2000
Uroptychus raymondi Baba, 2000

Taxa named by Manning include:

Acantholambrus Manning, 1980
Acantholambrus baumi Blow & Manning, 1996
Biffarius Manning & Felder, 1991
Chaceon fenneri (Manning & Holthuis, 1984)
Erythrosquilla Manning & Bruce, 1984
Erythrosquilla megalops Manning & Bruce, 1984
Erythrosquillidae Manning & Bruce, 1984
Erythrosquilloidea Manning & Bruce, 1984
Eurysquillidae Manning, 1977
Eurysquilloidea Manning, 1977
Gonodactylaceus Manning, 1995
Gonodactylellus Manning, 1995
Mithraculus cinctimanus Stimpson, 1860
Neogonodactylus Manning, 1995
Neotrypaea Manning & Felder, 1991
Nephropides Manning, 1969
Nephropides caribaeus Manning, 1969
Odontodactylidae Manning, 1980
Parasquillidae Manning, 1995
Parhippolyte sterreri (Hart & Manning, 1981)
Platysquilla Manning, 1967
Procarididae Chace & Manning, 1972
Procaridoidea Chace & Manning, 1972
Procaris Chace & Manning, 1972
Procaris ascensionis Chace & Manning, 1972
Procaris chacei Hart & Manning, 1986
Rissoides Manning & Lewinsohn, 1982
Sakaila Manning & Holthuis, 1981
Somersiella Hart & Manning, 1981
Tetrasquilla Manning & Chace, 1990
Tetrasquillidae Manning & Camp, 1993
Typhlatya iliffei Hart & Manning, 1981
Typhlatya rogersi Chace & Manning, 1972

References

American carcinologists
1934 births
2000 deaths
People from Brooklyn
University of Miami alumni
20th-century American zoologists
Scientists from New York (state)